Roda Rico (also formerly known as Roda São Paulo) is an observation wheel located in Candido Portinari Park, next to Villa-Lobos State Park, in the west zone of the city of São Paulo, Brazil. It has 42 cabins, which can accommodate up to eight people and are equipped with air conditioning, cameras, intercoms, Wi-Fi and scenic lighting, designed to interact with the city. It is housed in an area of 4,500 square meters, about 3% of the total area of the park.

Announced in October 2020, its assembly began in March 2022, under the responsibility of the company São Paulo Big Wheel, which will also be in charge of its maintenance and management, and would be inaugurated in July of the same year; however, the deadline was postponed due to lack of inputs and manpower. It was inaugurated on December 9. It is expected to receive between 600,000 and 1 million visitors annually.

With the aim of improving the quality of life in the region on the banks of the Pinheiros River, which is in the process of being revitalized, with Roda Rico being part of the actions to revitalize its surroundings, the Ferris wheel will be planted with native trees in open areas around it and its design gives priority to the use of pavements that help soil drainage — with possibilities for water reservation and use — and materials and resources that ensure a dry and clean work.

See also 
Rio Star
London Eye

References

External links 

2020 establishments in Brazil
Amusement rides introduced in 2020
Ferris wheels
Tourist attractions in São Paulo